Bursting at the Seams is the fifth studio album by English band Strawbs, released on 1 January 1973 by A&M Records. It was the first album to be released after the departure of founder member Tony Hooper and the recruitment of Dave Lambert. It contains their two most successful singles and peaked at No. 2 in the UK Album Chart and No. 65 in Canada.

Track listing
Side one
"Flying" (Dave Cousins) – 4:49
"Lady Fuschia" (Richard Hudson, John Ford) – 3:59
"Stormy Down" (Cousins) – 2:45
"Down by the Sea" (Cousins) – 6:17
"The River" (Cousins) – 2:21
"Down by the Sea" is placed after "The River" on the 1998 CD

Side two
"Part of the Union" (Hudson, Ford) – 2:54
"Tears and Pavan" – 6:35
"Tears" (Cousins)
"Pavan" (Cousins, Hudson, Ford)
"The Winter and the Summer" (Dave Lambert) – 4:07
"Lay Down" (Cousins) – 4:31
"Thank You" (Blue Weaver, Cousins) – 2:11

Bonus tracks - A&M 1998 remastered CD
"Will You Go"(aka "Wild Mountain Thyme") (Francis McPeake) – 3:54
"Backside" (Cousins, Hudson, Ford, Lambert, Weaver) – 3:49
"Lay Down" (Single version) (Cousins) – 3:33

Personnel
Dave Cousins – lead vocals, backing vocals, acoustic guitar, electric guitar, banjo
Dave Lambert – lead vocals, backing vocals, acoustic guitar, electric guitar
Blue Weaver – organ, piano, mellotron
John Ford – lead vocals, backing vocals, bass guitar
Richard Hudson – backing vocals, drums, sitar

Recording
Strawbs – Producers
Tom Allom – Engineer

Recorded at Sound Techniques, the Manor and Morgan Studios

Release history

References
Bursting at the Seams on Strawbsweb
Sleeve notes CD 540 936-2 Bursting at the Seams

Notes

Strawbs albums
1973 albums
A&M Records albums